WKKN (101.9 FM; "The Peak") is a radio station licensed to Westminster, Vermont, United States, with studios located in Keene, New Hampshire.  The station is owned by Great Eastern Radio, LLC. The station is simulcast on WTHK (100.7 FM) in Wilmington, Vermont.

History
The station went on the air as WCNL-FM in 1971, on 104.9 MHz  and was originally licensed to Newport, New Hampshire, and was on 101.7 FM with transmitting facilities atop Green Mountain in Claremont. On August 1, 1988, the station changed its call sign to WXXK-FM, and was the original home of the successful country station "Kixx" before moving to the more powerful 100.5 frequency in Lebanon, New Hampshire. On March 31, 1997, the call sign changed to WVRR and operated under the moniker V-101.  In 2002, Clear Channel merged V-101 with WMXR to become locally produced Rock 93.9 & 101.7. The station was granted a move by the FCC to change the city of license to Westminster, Vermont and move to its present frequency of 101.9 FM. After the move was completed, on April 14, 2008, the call sign was changed to the current WKKN; the station then introduced a Keene-focused rock format branded "K-Rock".

On October 1, 2012 WKKN changed its format to country, simulcasting WXXK; this change came after the bankruptcy of Nassau Broadcasting led to the sale of WHDQ (a classic rock station in Claremont that has long considered Keene to be part of its broadcast area) to Great Eastern Radio. The WXXK simulcast ended on March 16, 2015, when WKKN, along with WTHK in Wilmington (which had also been serving as a WXXK simulcast), launches an adult album alternative format branded as "The Peak." The station switched to a classic rock format on May 14, 2018, although it retained its existing branding.

Previous logos

References

External links

KKN
Radio stations established in 1971
Classic rock radio stations in the United States